Walter Benz (May 2, 1931 Lahnstein – January 13, 2017 Ratzeburg) was a German mathematician, an expert in geometry.

Benz studied at the Johannes Gutenberg University of Mainz and received his doctoral degree in 1954, with Robert Furch as his advisor.
After a position at the Johann Wolfgang Goethe University Frankfurt am Main, he served as a professor at Ruhr University Bochum, University of Waterloo, and University of Hamburg. Benz was honoured with the degree of a Dr. h.c.

Based on his book Vorlesungen über Geometrie der Algebren (Springer 1973), certain geometric objects are called Benz planes.

Inner product spaces over the real numbers provide the basis of a 2007 book by Benz: Classical Geometries in Modern Contexts.

See also
 List of University of Waterloo people

References

 Uta Hartmann (2009) "Walter Benz — 'Die Mathematik war mein Leben, ist mein Leben' ", Journal of Geometry 93:83–115.

External links
 Personal web site
 Oberwolfach Photo Collection

1931 births
2017 deaths
20th-century German mathematicians
Geometers
Johannes Gutenberg University Mainz alumni
Academic staff of the University of Waterloo
Academic staff of the University of Hamburg
Academic staff of Ruhr University Bochum